A Death in Canaan is a 1978 American made-for-television drama film directed by Tony Richardson and starring Stefanie Powers, Paul Clemens, and Brian Dennehy. Its plot concerns the true-life story of a teenager who is put on trial for the murder of his mother in a small Connecticut town.  Nominated for a Primetime Emmy Award, 1978.  The film is based on the nonfiction book of the same name by Joan Barthel.

The film first aired on the CBS Wednesday Night Movies on March 1, 1978, and was never officially released on any analog or digital medium for rental or sale.

Arthur Miller's one-act play Some Kind of Love Story (1984) is loosely based on the same incident.  He later adapted it into a screenplay for Everybody Wins (1990) starring Debra Winger and Nick Nolte.

Cast

 Stefanie Powers – Joan Barthel
 Paul Clemens – Peter Reilly
 Tom Atkins – Lt. Bragdon
 Jacqueline Brookes – Mildred Carston
 Brian Dennehy – Barney Parsons
 Conchata Ferrell – Rita Parsons
 Charles Haid – Sgt. Case
 Floyd Levine – Thomas Lanza
 Kenneth McMillan – Sgt. Tim Scully
 Gavan O'Herlihy – Father Mark
 Yuki Shimoda – Dr. Samura
 James Sutorius – Jim Barthel
 Bonnie Bartlett – Teresa Noble
 William Bronder – Judge Revere
 Pat Corley – Judge Vincet
 Art Mehr – Drugstore Owner Art
 Charles Hallahan – Cpl. Sebastian
 Mary Jackson – Sarah Biggens
 Sally Kemp – Barbara Gibbons
 Doreen Lang – Nurse Pynne
 Lane Smith – Bob Hartman
 Michael Talbott – Trooper Miles

Location
Outdoor scenes were filmed in Ferndale and Eureka, California.

References

External links
 

1978 films
1978 crime drama films
1978 television films
American crime drama films
CBS network films
Crime films based on actual events
Films based on non-fiction books
Films directed by Tony Richardson
Films set in Connecticut
Films shot in California
American drama television films
1970s English-language films
1970s American films